Charity Angya was a Nigerian Vice Chancellor at Benue State University.

Life
Charity Angya graduated at the University of Jos in 1983. She took her honours and doctorate at the University of Ibadan. 

In 2000 Charity Angya's plays were published under the title "The Cycle of the Moon, and Other Plays" and in 2005 her book titled "Perspectives on Violence Against Women in Nigeria" was published.

Angya was appointed to be Vice Chancellor of Benue State University in November  2010 where she was already working.

Professor Msugh N. Kembe took over from Angya as the Vice-chancellor on 3 November 2015.

In 1 June 2021 Angya was at a meeting of women concerned at the number of killings by "herdsman". The women met at a hotel dressed in mourning clothes and called on the President to take action. Spokespeople for the women were Mrs Rebecca Apezan who was a former member of parliament and Angya as a former vice-chancellor.

Private life
She is married to Paul Angya who is a technocrat.

See also
List of vice chancellors in Nigeria

References

Living people
Vice-Chancellors of Nigerian universities
Year of birth missing (living people)
University of Ibadan alumni
University of Jos alumni
Benue State University people
Women academic administrators
Nigerian women academics